Jean Piot (10 May 1890 – 15 December 1961) was a French fencer. He won two gold medals at the 1932 Summer Olympics.

References

External links
 

1890 births
1961 deaths
French male épée fencers
French male foil fencers
Olympic fencers of France
Fencers at the 1928 Summer Olympics
Fencers at the 1932 Summer Olympics
Fencers at the 1936 Summer Olympics
Olympic gold medalists for France
People from Saint-Quentin, Aisne
Olympic medalists in fencing
Medalists at the 1932 Summer Olympics
Sportspeople from Aisne